The 2020–21 Louisiana Tech Lady Techsters basketball team represented Louisiana Tech University during the 2020–21 NCAA Division I women's basketball season. The team was led by fifth-year head coaches Brooke Stoehr & Scott Stoehr, and played their home games at the Thomas Assembly Center in Ruston, Louisiana as a member of Conference USA.

Schedule and results

|-
!colspan=12 style=|Non-conference regular season

|-
!colspan=12 style=|CUSA regular season

|-
!colspan=12 style=| CUSA Tournament

See also
 2020–21 Louisiana Tech Bulldogs basketball team

Notes

References

Louisiana Tech Lady Techsters basketball seasons
Louisiana Tech Lady Techsters
Louisiana Tech Lady Techsters basketball
Louisiana Tech Lady Techsters basketball